The UK Albums Chart is one of many music charts compiled by the Official Charts Company that calculates the best-selling albums of the week in the United Kingdom. Before 2004, the chart was only based on the sales of physical albums. This list shows albums that peaked in the Top 10 of the UK Albums Chart during 1983, as well as albums which peaked in 1982 and 1984 but were in the top 10 in 1983. The entry date is when the album appeared in the top ten for the first time (week ending, as published by the Official Charts Company, which is six days after the chart is announced).

The first new number-one album of the year was the compilation album Raiders of the Pop Charts. Overall, twenty-one different albums peaked at number-one in 1983, with Michael Jackson (2) having the most albums hit that position.

Background

Best-selling albums
Michael Jackson had the best-selling album of the year with Thriller. No Parlez by Paul Young came in second place Colour by Numbers by Culture Club, Let's Dance by David Bowie and Fantastic by Wham! made up the top five. Albums by Spandau Ballet, Elaine Paige, Genesis and Lionel Richie were also in the top-ten best selling albums of the year.

Top-ten albums
Key

See also
1983 in British music
List of number-one albums from the 1980s (UK)

References
General

Specific

External links
1983 album chart archive at the Official Charts Company (click on relevant week)

United Kingdom top 10 albums
Top 10 albums
1983